Mauro Antonio Donato Laus (b. Lavello, 7 August 1966) is an Italian politician of the Democratic Party, who serves as a Senator. He is a member of the Legislature XVIII of Italy.

Biography 
After spending his childhood and adolescence in Lavello (PZ), he moved to Turin. He is married and has two children.

Political activity 
In the 2005 regional elections in Piedmont he was elected regional councilor, on the Margherita lists, in the province of Turin. He was also re-elected in the subsequent regional 2010, in the lists of the Democratic Party. Re-elected councilor again also at the 2014 regional councils,  on 30 May 2014 he was elected president of the Piedmont Regional Council.

Election as Senator 
In the 2018 general elections of Italy he was elected to the Senate of the Republic in the single-member constituency of Turin, supported by the Democratic Party.

Controversy 
In 2018, during a heated debate in the Senate, he reportedly told Senator Alessandra Maiorino (M5S) to return to the kitchen, attracting criticism and bipartisan accusations of sexism.

References 

Living people
People from Lavello
1966 births
Senators of Legislature XVIII of Italy
21st-century Italian politicians
20th-century Italian people